Birky is a selo in Chuhuiv Raion of Kharkiv Oblast, Ukraine, with a population of 2936 in 2001. Birky belongs to Zmiiv urban hromada, one of the hromadas of Ukraine.

History 

1321 persons were recorded in 1864. Railway opened in 1869. This was the site of the Borki train disaster in 1888, which nearly killed Emperor Alexander III of Russia. 2791 residents were living here in 1914.

Until 18 July 2020, Birky belonged to Zmiiv Raion. The raion was abolished in July 2020 as part of the administrative reform of Ukraine, which reduced the number of raions of Kharkiv Oblast to seven. The area of Zmiiv Raion was merged into Chuhuiv Raion.

References

Villages in Chuhuiv Raion